Serge Payer (born May 7, 1979) is a Canadian professional ice hockey player. Payer retired at the end of the 2011 season where he played with Vålerenga Ishockey of the GET-ligaen. Payer played 119 career NHL games with the Florida Panthers and Ottawa Senators,  scoring 7 goals and 6 assists for 13 points.

Playing career
Payer was signed as an undrafted free agent by the Florida Panthers on 30 September 1997.

In 1999, Payer's career nearly came to an end when he was diagnosed with Guillain–Barré syndrome while playing junior hockey for the Kitchener Rangers. After a 10-month battle with the disease and subsequent bout with mononucleosis, he returned to the Rangers before eventually making his NHL debut on November 13, 2000, against the Atlanta Thrashers. He scored his first NHL goal in a game against the Ottawa Senators at the Corel Centre (now: Canadian Tire Centre) in front of family and friends. He has started a foundation to raise money for Guillain–Barré syndrome research and to promote public awareness of the disease. He holds a boat cruise once a year in Ottawa, in his name, with close friends, family and the public.

Payer signed as a free agent with the Minnesota Wild on August 20, 2007, but was not able to crack their NHL roster.

After playing two seasons for German team Krefeld Pinguine of the Deutsche Eishockey Liga, he signed a contract with Norwegian team Vålerenga of the GET-ligaen on 5 January 2011.

Serge has now retired from pro hockey, and works as an agent and advisor for elite hockey talent through his company, Unlimited Sports Management.

Career statistics

References

External links
Serge Payer Foundation

1979 births
Binghamton Senators players
Canadian ice hockey centres
Florida Panthers players
Franco-Ontarian people
Houston Aeros (1994–2013) players
Kitchener Rangers players
Krefeld Pinguine players
Living people
Louisville Panthers players
Ottawa Senators players
People from Clarence-Rockland
San Antonio Rampage players
Undrafted National Hockey League players
Utah Grizzlies (AHL) players
Vålerenga Ishockey players
Canadian expatriate ice hockey players in Norway
Canadian expatriate ice hockey players in Germany
People with Guillain–Barré syndrome